Marie Anselme Victor Henri Laugel (3 April 1851, Strasbourg - 29 July 1928, Bœrsch) was a French-Alsatian author and politician.

Biography 
His father, François Joseph Victor Laugel (1817-1885), a locksmith, served on the Strasbourg City Council, as did his grandfather, François Antoine Laugel (1779-1848), who was also a locksmith. After attending a lycée in his hometown, and the Jesuit College in Metz, he took his degree in 1870. That same year, he served with the "Légions d'Alsace-Lorraine" in Lyon, during the Franco-Prussian War.

After the annexation of Alsace-Lorraine in 1871, he left to study in Paris. Later, he worked for the Secretariat of the French Senate. In 1897, he married Marie Hervé (1861-1948), daughter of the district tax collector. They had no children.

In addition to his political activities, he was a devoted amateur artist. He provided numerous articles on the arts and culture of Alsace, and wrote several books on the subject. He and Spindler also created the "", an artists' association, whose members included Léon Hornecker, Alfred Marzolff, Joseph Sattler, Léo Schnug, Lothar von Seebach and Gustave Stoskopf. 

At the outbreak of World War I, he sided with France and was condemned as a traitor by the Germans. After the war, the French government made him responsible for monitoring the holdings at museums and libraries throughout Alsace. One of his first actions was to remove German-speaking staff from those institutions. In 1919, he was named a Knight in the Legion of Honor.

References

Further reading 
 Christian Baechler: "LAUGEL Marie Anselme Victor Henri", in: Nouveau dictionnaire de biographie alsacienne, Vol. 23, pg.2235
 Anselme LAUGEL (1851-1928): Homme politique, écrivain, peintre et mécène, Amis du Leonards au et du cercle de St-Léonard (Online)
 "Regierung und Landtag von Elsaß-Lothringen 1911–1916", Biographisch-statistisches Handbuch, Mülhausen 1911, pg.195

External links

Works by Laugel 
 La Résistance de l'Alsace-Lorraine @ Gallica
 La Terre fidèle @ Gallica

1851 births
1928 deaths
Politicians from Strasbourg
Writers from Strasbourg
French art patrons

Recipients of the Legion of Honour
Alsatian people